Khalil Dashtizadeh (Persian: خلیل دشتی‌زاده; 1950 Abadan; Iran) is an Iranian retired fighter pilot who flew with Grumman F-14 Tomcat during the Iran–Iraq War.

He has been credited him with 5 confirmed aerial victories, a record that qualifies him as a flying ace.

See also 

 List of Iranian flying aces

References 

Iran–Iraq War flying aces
Iranian flying aces
Living people
Year of birth missing (living people)
Islamic Republic of Iran Air Force personnel
Iranian military personnel of the Iran–Iraq War